Schinia antonio is a moth of the family Noctuidae. It is endemic to southern Texas.

The wingspan is about 9 mm.

The larvae feed on Aphanostephus species.

External links
Images
Butterflies and Moths of North America

Schinia
Endemic fauna of Texas
Moths of North America
Moths described in 1906